The 9th Annual Transgender Erotica Awards was a pornographic awards event recognizing the best in transgender pornography form the previous year from 15 November 2015 to 15 November 2016.

Pre-nominations opened from November 1 to November 20, 2016, and the public-at-large was able to suggest nominees using an online form. Nominees were announced on December 21, 2016, online on the theteashow.com website, with fan voting opening on the same day. The winners were announced during the awards on March 5, 2017. The awards open to fan voting were the fan award which was open to all and site-specific awards which were open to members of the forums of the specific sites who met specific criteria regarding; a number of postings and a date to have been a member before.

The format of the Awards was changed and formed the final part of a three-day event. A total of 400 people were reported by organisers to have attended the event.

Winners and nominees
The nominations for the 8th Transgender Erotica Awards were announced online on December 21, 2016, and opened to fan voting on the same day, when pre-nominations closed, online on the theteashow.com website. The winners were announced during the awards on March 5, 2017.

Awards
Winners are listed first, highlighted in boldface.

References

 Transgender Erotica Awards
 Pornographic film awards
21st-century awards
 American pornographic film awards
 Annual events in the United States
 Awards established in 2008
 Culture of Los Angeles
 Adult industry awards